Queiroz is a municipality in the state of São Paulo in Brazil. The population is 3,460 (2020 est.) in an area of 234.91 km². The elevation is 431 m.

See also
Queiroz (surname)

References

Municipalities in São Paulo (state)